Pedro Miguel Neves da Costa (born 11 March 1994 in Abrantes, Santarém District), known as Costinha, is a Portuguese footballer  who plays as a central defender for Luxembourg club US Mondorf-les-Bains.

References

External links

Portuguese League profile 

1994 births
Living people
People from Abrantes
Sportspeople from Santarém District
Portuguese footballers
Association football defenders
Liga Portugal 2 players
Segunda Divisão players
Associação Naval 1º de Maio players
C.D. Trofense players
Louletano D.C. players
Luxembourg National Division players
US Mondorf-les-Bains players
Portuguese expatriate footballers
Expatriate footballers in Luxembourg
Portuguese expatriate sportspeople in Luxembourg